Neela is a feminine given name

Neela may also refer to:

Neela (film), 2001 Kannada film
Neela Tele Films, an Indian television production house
Neela, Chakwal, Pakistan, a village